The Armenian Catholic Eparchy of Alexandria (or Iskanderiya) is a suffragan eparchy (Eastern Catholicdiocese) of the Armenian Catholic Church sui iuris (Armenian Rite in Armenian language), in the Patriarch's own 'ecclesiastical province of Cilicia' (actually based in Beirut, Lebanon), covering Egypt and Sudan.

Its cathedral is the Annunciation Cathedral is in Cairo and not in Alexandria as the title of the eparchy states.

History 
Established in 1885 as Eparchy (Diocese) of Iskanderiya / Alexandria, on territory separated for the particular church sui iuris from the Latin Catholic Apostolic Vicariate of Egypt.

Episcopal ordinaries

Suffragan Eparchs (Bishops) of Alexandria (Iskanderiya) (of the Armenians)
 Boghos Sabbaghian (1901.08.28 – 1904.08.04), later Patriarch of Cilicia of the Armenians (Lebanon) ([1904.08.04] 1904.11.14 – death 1910)
 Pietro Kojunian (1907.02.26 – retired 1911.03.17); emeritate as Titular Archbishop of Chalcedon of the Armenians (1911.03.17 – 1937.12.13)
 Giovanni Couzian, Patriarchal Clergy Institute of Bzommar (I.C.P.B.) (1911.08.27 – death 1933.05.06)
Archbishop-Bishop Jacques Nessimian (1933.08.05 – death 1960.07.02), previously Archeparch (Archbishop) of Mardin of the Armenians (Turkey) ([1928.06.29] 1928.07.01 – 1933.08.05)
 Raphaël Bayan (1960.07.02 – retired 1989.03.09), succeeding as former Titular Bishop of Taua (1958.12.12 – 1960.07.02) & Coadjutor Eparch of Alexandria (1958.12.12 – 1960.07.02)
 Boutros Taza Tarmouni (1989.08.21 – 1999.10.07), later Patriarch of Cilicia of the Armenians (Lebanon) ([1999.10.07] 1999.10.13 – 2015.06.25), President of Synod of the Armenian Catholic Church (1999.10.13 – 2015.06.25)
 Kricor-Okosdinos Coussa (2004.01.07 – ...), also Patriarchal Exarch of Jerusalem and Amman of the Armenians (Jordan) (2015.11.25 – 2019.05.10)

List of Churches 
List of Armenian Catholic churches in Egypt

 Annunciation Cathedral, Cairo
 Church of the Resurrection in the cemetery, Cairo
 Saint Teresa Church, Heliopolis
 Church of the Immaculate Conception, Alexandria

See also 
 Catholic Church in Egypt
List of Catholic dioceses in Egypt
List of cathedrals in Egypt

References

External links 
 GCatholic with titular incumbent biography links

Armenian diaspora in Africa
Armenian diaspora in Egypt
Armenian Catholic eparchies
Eastern Catholicism in Egypt
Eastern Catholicism in Sudan